The Ferris Mountains are a small mountain range in Carbon County, Wyoming. A high white cliff undulates along the entire length of the south side of the range, making it uniquely noticeable. The cliff is predominantly visible from U.S. Route 287.

Most of the range is covered by a BLM Wilderness Study Area.

See also
 List of mountain ranges in Wyoming

Notes

External links
 Ferris Mountains Wilderness Study Area - BLM page

Mountain ranges of Wyoming
Landforms of Carbon County, Wyoming